Stadion Schiervelde (official name) is a multi-use stadium in Roeselare, Belgium. It was used mostly for football matches and was the home ground of K.S.V. Roeselare until 2020. The stadium has a capacity of 8,340.

References

Multi-purpose stadiums in Belgium
Football venues in Flanders
Sports venues in West Flanders
K.S.V. Roeselare
Roeselare